The 2012 FIBA Africa Women's Clubs Champions Cup (18th edition), was an international basketball tournament  held in Abidjan, Ivory Coast, from October 19 to 28, 2012. The tournament, organized by FIBA Africa and hosted by Club Sportif d'Abidjan, was contested by 10 clubs split into 2 groups, the first four of which qualifying for the knock-out stage.
 
The tournament was won by Liga Muçulmana from Mozambique.

Draw

Squads

Qualification

Preliminary rounds
Times given below are in UTC.

Group A

Group B

Knockout stage

Quarter finals

9th place

5th-8th place

Semifinals

7th place

5th place

Bronze medal game

Gold medal game

Final standings

Liga Muçulmana rosterAnabela Cossa, Aya Traore, Cátia Halar, Clarisse Machanguana, Deolinda Ngulela, Filomena Micato, Ingvild Mucauro, Jazz Covington, Leia Dongue, Odélia Mafanela, Rute Muianga, Valerdina Manhonga, Coach: Nazir Salé

All Tournament Team

See also
 2013 FIBA Africa Championship for Women

References

External links 
 2012 FIBA Africa Champions Cup for Women Official Website
 FIBA Africa official website

2012 FIBA Africa Women's Clubs Champions Cup
2012 FIBA Africa Women's Clubs Champions Cup
2012 FIBA Africa Women's Clubs Champions Cup
FIBA